Pilea serpyllacea is an herbaceous plant native to Venezuela, Bolivia, Colombia, Ecuador, and Peru.  It has been introduced into a number of areas outside its native range, such as Hawaii and the Galapagos.

References

serpyllacea